The 2021 Nuneaton and Bedworth Borough Council election was held on 6 May 2021 as part of the 2021 United Kingdom local elections and alongside elections for Warwickshire County Council and Warwickshire Police and Crime Commissioner. Half of the borough council seats were up for election and the results provided the Conservative Party with a majority on the council, with the party winning all but two seats up for election.

Background 

Nuneaton and Bedworth operates a divided election cycle. Each ward is represented by two councillors who each serve staggered four year terms. The result is that seventeen members of the borough council are elected every two years. The seats contested in this election were originally scheduled to be facing election in 2020 but these elections were postponed (alongside all local and national elections in the UK) due to the COVID-19 pandemic.

At the 2018 Nuneaton and Bedworth Borough Council election, the Conservative Party gained nine seats, including eight from the Labour Party. As a result, Labour lost control of the council and it had no overall control going into the election.
Prior to the election, the Conservative Party had not won a majority on the borough council since the 2008 election.

Results 

Half of the council's 34 seats were contested in the election. At the last election, the Labour Party won twelve of these seats, the Conservative Party won four and the Green Party won one. Conservative candidates won a total of eleven seats from Labour incumbents, providing them with overall control of the Nuneaton and Bedworth Borough Council. Labour held only the Abbey ward while the Green incumbent retained his seat in Weddington.

Council composition 

As a result of winning eleven seats, the Conservative Party secured a majority on the borough council. Prior to the election, Nuneaton and Bedworth had a Labour-led administration despite no single party having overall control of the council.

Party reaction 

Local members of the Conservative Party celebrated the result. Marcus Jones, the Conservative MP for Nuneaton, described being 'absolutely ecstatic' over 'a brilliant night with fantastic results'.
Kris Wilson, who became the Conservative leader of the borough council after the election, positioned the results in the broader political context of Conservative gains in traditional Labour-voting areas. Referencing the 'red wall', he said 'I think we have seen that red wall crumble here in Nuneaton and Bedworth too, people want change, people have been out and voted for it'. After losing her seat in the Wem Brook ward, Labour council leader Julie Jackson pledged that the party would respond: 'we will fight and we will be back out there listening hard to the good people of Nuneaton and Bedworth'.

Ward results 

Changes shown compared to the 2016 Nuneaton and Bedworth Borough Council election, when these seats were last contested. Swing figures are calculated between the winning candidate and the candidate in second place. Turnout figures do not include spoiled ballots.

Abbey

Arbury

Attleborough

Barpool

Bede

Bulkington

Camp Hill

Exhall 

In 2016, the Exhall ward elected two councillors in the same election. For this reason, directly comparing results is not possible.

Galley Common 

Daniel Gissane was elected as a Conservative candidate in Galley Common in the 2016 Nuneaton and Bedworth Council election but left the party to sit as an independent alongside the Nuneaton Community Independents. He did not stand for re-election.

Heath

Kingswood

Poplar

Slough

St. Nicolas

Weddington

Wem Brook 

Due to the extremely close nature of the result, the Wem Brook ward ballots were subject to two re-counts.

Whitestone

By-elections

Bar Pool

See also 

2021 Warwickshire County Council election, local election held on the same day in Nuneaton and Bedworth
2021 Warwickshire Police and Crime Commissioner election, local election held on the same day in Nuneaton and Bedworth

Footnotes

References 

Nuneaton
Nuneaton and Bedworth Borough Council elections